Byasa rhadinus is a species of butterfly from the family Papilionidae. It is found in China.

Taxonomy
Originally described as Papilio mencius Felder, 1862 subsp. rhadinus Jordan, 1928, this butterfly was considered conspecific with Atrophaneura mencius   (e.g., Collins & Morris 1985, Fujioka et al. 1997). It has been reclassified as a viable species by Chou (1994).

References

External links
 External images of Holotype

Butterflies described in 1928
Byasa